Oshinowo is a surname.  Notable people with the surname include:

 Babatunde Oshinowo (born 1983), American football player
 Nike Oshinowo (born 1966), Nigerian talk show host, entrepreneur, and style icon
 Oladosun Oshinowo (1941–2013), Nigerian lawyer and politician
 Tosin Oshinowo, Nigerian architect
 Adeniyi Adejimi Osinowo, 16th Commandant of the National Defence College